Thunderbird is an album by American jazz drummer Louis Bellson featuring performances recorded in 1965 for the Impulse! label.

Reception
The Allmusic review awarded the album 3 stars.

Track listing
 "Thunderbird" (Bellson, F. Thompson) - 4:27   
 "The Little Pixie" (Thad Jones) - 5:18   
 "Nails" (Jimmy Heath) - 4:18   
 "Serenade in Blues" (Jay Hill) - 5:08   
 "Back on the Scene" (Kenny Sampson) - 3:44   
 "No More Blues" (Antonio Carlos Jobim, Vinícius de Moraes) - 4:28   
 "Cotton Tail" (Duke Ellington) - 7:07   
 "Softly With Feeling" (Neil Hefti) - 3:43

Personnel
Louis Bellson – drums
Harry Edison - trumpet
Carl Fontana - trombone
Sam Most – alto saxophone
Ed Scarazzo – tenor saxophone
Jim Mulidore - baritone saxophone
Arnold Teich - piano
Jim Cook – bass

References

Impulse! Records albums
Louie Bellson albums
1966 albums
Albums produced by Bob Thiele